is a former Japanese football player.

Playing career
Shota Saito played for FC Machida Zelvia and Azul Claro Numazu from 2013 to 2015.

References

External links

1994 births
Living people
Association football people from Tokyo
Japanese footballers
J3 League players
Japan Football League players
FC Machida Zelvia players
Azul Claro Numazu players
Association football forwards